Hexafluronium (or hexafluorenium) is a muscle relaxant. It acts as a nicotinic acetylcholine receptor antagonist.

References 

Muscle relaxants
Bromides
Nicotinic antagonists
Quaternary ammonium compounds
Fluorenes